Jennifer Cecily Ward-Lealand  (born 8 November 1962) is a New Zealand theatre and film actor /director, teacher and intimacy coordinator. She has worked for 40 years, appearing in over 120 theatre performances: Greek, Shakespeare, drama, comedy, devised, and musical theatre. Her screen credits include the 1993 movie Desperate Remedies as well as appearances in The Footstep Man, the soap Shortland Street and Australian comedy series Full Frontal.

Biography
Ward-Lealand was born in Wellington, New Zealand to Philippa "Pippa" Mary (née Ward) and Conrad Ainsley Lealand. She has an older sister, Diana Mary Ward-Pickering and a half brother Simcha Lindt. From the age of seven, after experiencing the buzz of joining the cast of Oedipus Rex at Unity Theatre, Ward-Lealand knew that she wanted to be an actor.

Since 1988 she has been married to actor Michael Hurst of Hercules: The Legendary Journeys fame. They met at Theatre Corporate, then performed in 22 shows together, before their  two sons were born in 1997 and 1999. The sons follow 'family tradition'  by working in film and music production.

Ward-Lealand's first ongoing television role was as Jan in Close to Home (1978–1980).  She sought opportunities to develop her theatre skills with roles at Downstage Youth Theatre. After leaving school, Ward-Lealand spent a year touring New Zealand in a community theatre group, The Town and Country Players, performing clown shows and appearing in Chekhov's one-act play The Bear. When she was seventeen, she had the epiphany that she wanted to train at Theatre Corporate, inspired by a performance of Metamorphosis directed by Raymond Hawthorne.

After first attending a summer school at Auckland's  influential Theatre Corporate, Ward-Lealand then completed in 1982 a year-long diploma in acting with Paul Minnifie and Raymond Hawthorne as the main teacher /directors.  She credits her intense training at Theatre Corporate with instilling discipline, fortitude and ensemble experience. Work  followed between the venues of Theatre Corporate and Mercury Theatre, with opportunities to develop a classic cabaret repertoire showcasing Ward-Lealand performing songs by Irving Berlin, Rodgers and Hart, Stephen Sondheim and Kurt Weill.

Meanwhile Ward-Lealand appeared in the short-lived TV drama Seekers, before her breakthrough television role in "Danny and Raewyn", an episode from the About Face series. Filmed largely in an Auckland flat, so cramped the cameraman sometimes had to sit on the stove, this tale of working class relationship breakdown would win Ward-Lealand a GOFTA Best Actress Award. The same year Ward-Lealand made her big screen debut as nightclub singer Costello – and sang three songs – in Wellington crime thriller Dangerous Orphans.

In 2007, she toured her acclaimed Marlene Dietrich cabaret show, Falling in Love Again (also the name of her first solo CD) in New Zealand and Australia. She later toured with the same show in 2018. Her engagement in the cabaret diva genre became a hallmark of her style as a singer. In 2014, she was touring Jacques Brel songs solo in several Arts Festivals: Auckland, Tauranga, Nelson, Christchurch and Taranaki. 

Ward-Lealand was a founding board member of Watershed Theatre and a co-founder of the Large Group and The Actors’ Program. She is a Patron of Q Theatre and serves as a trust board member of Arts Regional Trust and The New Zealand Actors Benevolent Fund. An advocate for improving actors' working conditions and pay, Ward-Lealand has been  President of Equity New Zealand since 2015. After years as a teacher of the craft of acting, Ward-Lealand started training as an intimacy coordinator in 2018, and in 2020 she was hired as such by Amazon Prime Video's The Lord of the Rings: The Rings of Power. She has worked on over 40 shows in this role as an accredited intimacy coordinator. Her overall aim is to "make actors' lives better" by applying the best practice guidelines of Equity New Zealand. 

Since performing in Hedda Gabler, the last Theatre Corporate production, Ward-Lealand has contributed significant roles to the Silo Theatre, such as Stevie in The Goat or Who is Sylvie by Edward Albee performed in 2005 with her husband Michael Hurst. However, her most extensive repertoire has been programmed by the Auckland Theatre Company (ATC), such as  the 2020 online role of Arkadina in ATC's  zoom production of  Chekhov's The Seagull. Ward-Lealand has also made frequent guest appearances in The Basement's Christmas comedies, whether playing Helen Clark or Dame Kiri Te Kanawa.  Ward-Lealand's roles in New Zealand plays include  Pass it On, The Bach, Via Satellite, The Sex Fiend, Rita and Angus and My Name is Gary Cooper. Through play readings and workshops, she has also supported the development of local scripts, such as Pankhurst in Red by Dean Parker, or Irene in Flour by Briar-Grace Smith (Centrepoint Theatre's 24-Hour Challenge Online). Ward-Lealand leads a highly organised life thanks to speaking engagements, rehearsals, adjudication, voice tutoring, and production meetings. What inspires her is to 'work with great people on great projects'.  

Jennifer Ward-Lealand is fluent in te reo the language of New Zealand's indigenous Māori people. Ward-Lealand, who herself is not Māori, started learning the language after not being able to respond to a traditional , or welcome speech. She has directed Aroha Awaru's scripts, such as Exclusive in 2020.  2021 led to a new challenge through collaboration with Awaru and the producer Peata Melbourne. Ward-Lealand took on screen direction of the short film Disrupt about P addiction in Aotearoa, ending with a message of hope and redemption.

Filmography

Stage performances 
Gifted the title, Te Atamira (The Stage), Jennifer Ward-Lealand has been involved in over 120 performances. Refer to her web-site for student and devised work, play readings, workshops and guest appearances.

Theatre direction 
Ward-Lealand has directed a significant range of theatre performances, working first in 2002 with Unitec acting students in a production of The Big River. Since then, she has directed a range of shows, including A Christmas Carol (2003) for Auckland Theatre Company adapted by Dave Armstrong at Sky City Theatre (2003), the caberet Jaques Brel is Alive and Well and Living in Paris, (Silo Theatre) (2005);  Top Girls by Caryl Churchill at Unitec (2008); Tic Tic a comedy by Paul Barrett and Michelanne Forster (2010); Fallout: the Sinking of the Rainbow Warrior with The Large Group (2015); Hudson & Hall Live! – Silo and that That Bloody Woman by Luke Di Somma and Gregory Cooper (2017 tour).

Accolades
Ward-Lealand's contribution to New Zealand theatre was recognised in 2007 New Year Honours with her investiture as an Officer of the New Zealand Order of Merit, for services to theatre and the community.

In 2017 Ward-Lealand was gifted the name Te Atamira (The Stage) by Sir Tīmoti Kāretu and the late Prof Te Wharehuia Milroy. 

In October 2018 she was presented with a Scroll of Honour from the Variety Artists Club of New Zealand for her contribution to New Zealand entertainment.

In 2019| Ward-Lealand was awarded the Westpac Women of Influence Award for Arts & Culture. 

In 2019| she gained an Award of Excellence as an Actress in theAccolade Global Film Competitions 

In the 2019 New Year Honours, Ward-Lealand was appointed a Companion of the New Zealand Order of Merit, for services to theatre, film and television and for her advocacy for actors' working conditions and pay. In the same year, she won the New Zealand Women of Influence Award in the Arts and Culture section.

In 2020 she was awarded Centennial Award for International Women’s Day by the Zonta Club of Auckland;| and E Tū Unionist of the Year (with Marianne Bishop) 

Most significantly Ward-Lealand won the New Zealander of the Year Award in 2020, being recognised for her dedication to performing arts and her commitment and passion for te reo Māori.

References

External links
 The official website of Jennifer Ward-Lealand
 
Jennifer Ward-Lealand interview  with her husband Michael Hurst for the Cultural Icons project. Audio and video. https://culturalicons.co.nz/45-michael-hurst-and-jennifer-ward-lealand/
EPISODE 20 : JENNIFER TE ATAMIRA WARD-LEALAND - podcas on Youtube - Garage Drinks with Mike 

1962 births
Living people
New Zealand television actresses
New Zealand stage actresses
New Zealand soap opera actresses
Companions of the New Zealand Order of Merit
20th-century New Zealand actresses
21st-century New Zealand actresses
New Zealand Women of Influence Award recipients